Chasing Rainbows is a 2012 Romanian comedy film directed by Dan Chisu.

References

External links 

2012 comedy films
2012 films
Romanian comedy films
2010s Romanian-language films